Arroyo Las Positas is a  westward-flowing watercourse in Alameda County, California, which begins at the confluence of Arroyo Seco and Cayetano Creek north of Livermore, and empties into Arroyo Mocho in Dublin, California.

See also
 List of watercourses in the San Francisco Bay Area

References

Rivers of Alameda County, California
El Camino Viejo
Dublin, California
Rivers of Northern California
Tributaries of Alameda Creek